FK Gostivar was a football club based in the city of Gostivar, Republic of Macedonia. It was founded in 1919 and was one of the oldest clubs in the country.

In 2010 the club was merged with KF Rinia founded in 1998 (then renamed to KF Gostivari), and after that the club was dissolved.

Supporters
The supporters group Gemidžii is named after the anarchistic group who have committed the bombings in Thessaloniki in 1903 and the name is similar to an supporters group of FK Borec from Veles.

Honours
 Macedonian Second League:
Third place (1): 1994–95

External links
Club info at Macedonian Football 
Football Federation of Macedonia 

Defunct football clubs in North Macedonia
Association football clubs established in 1919
Association football clubs disestablished in 2010
1919 establishments in Yugoslavia
2010 disestablishments in the Republic of Macedonia
Gostivar